Sarangesa astrigera, commonly known as the white-speckled elfin, is a species of butterfly in the family Hesperiidae. It is mostly found in Uganda, Tanzania, the Democratic Republic of the Congo (Katanga Province), Zambia, Malawi and northern Zimbabwe. The habitat consists of Brachystegia woodland.

Adults are on wing year round. There are distinct seasonal forms.

References

Butterflies described in 1894
Celaenorrhinini
Butterflies of Africa